Grasshopper Township is a township in Atchison County, Kansas, United States. As of the 2010 census, its population was 567.

History
Grasshopper Township was established in 1855 as one of the three original townships of Atchison County.

Geography
According to the USGS, it contains three cemeteries: Brush Creek, Forest Grove and Wheatland.

The streams of Brush Creek, Clear Creek, Little Delaware River, Little Grasshopper Creek, Mission Creek, Otter Creek and South Creek run through this township.

References
 USGS Geographic Names Information System (GNIS)

External links
 US-Counties.com
 City-Data.com

Townships in Atchison County, Kansas
Townships in Kansas
1855 establishments in Kansas Territory